The Bunbury Outer Ring Road (BORR) is a partially-constructed ring road around the city of Bunbury, Western Australia.

Route description
The construction of the BORR was divided into three stages. The first stage involved the construction of the central section of the road, between the southern section of South Western Highway and Boyanup-Picton Road. The second stage is the northern section, between Forrest Highway and Boyanup-Picton Road. The third stage is the southern section, between South Western Highway and Bussell Highway.

The second stage of the BORR will commence at a modified dogbone interchange with Forrest Highway, Paris Road and Clifton Road. The interchange will split Forrest Highway into two sections, with the northern section of the highway continuing south as the BORR with traffic wanting to continue along the southern part of the highway into Bunbury having to take an exit ramp. This aspect of the design was contentious, as the City of Bunbury wanted for Forrest Highway to be continuous so that more traffic would head into the centre of Bunbury. Only the northbound entrance and southbound exit ramps will be built, with the southbound exit ramp being a loop ramp so that traffic heading towards Bunbury does not have to give way to traffic on Clifton Road. Heading east from the future interchange is Clifton Road, which leads to the town of Brunswick Junction. Heading west is Paris Road, which heads into Australind.

The BORR then passes over the Collie River. Following that, the BORR will cross over the South Western Railway and then bend to the west, coming to an at-grade intersection with Discovery Road. The intersection's layout is designed such that Discovery Road traffic will have to turn left or right and cannot cross over the ring road. The road will then travel east-southeast, bridging over Golding Crescent, the Ferguson River, the Northcliffe Branch railway and Boyanup-Picton Road, meeting the currently-opened section of the road. The ring road will be cut off from Boyanup-Picton Road by the time stage two of the ring road is complete. The road intersects with Willinge Drive at a roundabout  further. Willinge Drive, also known as the Bunbury Port Access Road, leads to the industrial area of Picton and the Bunbury Port in Vittoria. A further  is the southern section of South Western Highway, where the currently-open section of the BORR terminates at a roundabout.

West of the currently-open section will be stage three of the BORR. This section will curve to the south, intersecting with Lillydale Road as a roundabout, before curving to the west again and passing under a Yalinda Drive bridge. This section has Jilley Road as a frontage road to the east. Soon after this, the BORR will come to its south-western terminus as an interchange with Bussell Highway. The southbound Bussell Highway carriageway will pass over the BORR and then merge with the road.

History

Stage one
The first stage of the BORR received $15.8 million in funding in the 2010 state budget for land acquisition and pre-construction activities. The BORR's first stage was constructed as part of the second stage of the Bunbury Port Access Road project. This saw the construction of Willinge Drive from South Western Highway to the BORR and the construction of the BORR from South Western Highway to Boyanup-Picton Road. This stage followed on from the Bunbury Port Access Road project's first section, which was Willinge Drive from the Bunbury Port to South Western Highway. The contract for this was awarded to Fulton Hogan at a cost of $133.9 million, jointly funded by the federal and state governments. Out of that cost, $44 million was for the ring road. Construction was completed in May 2013.

Stages two and three
The second stage of the BORR was recommended to be built by Infrastructure Australia's National Infrastructure Plan in 2013.

Expressions of interest were called for in September 2019. The plans at the time had the road be built to a freeway standard with grade separations at all junctions. The project had $681.6 million of federal government funding and $170.4 million of state government funding. During this time, the state government had been lobbying the federal government to include duplication of Bussell Highway within the BORR project. Funding was brought forward by a year in November 2019, allowing construction to begin in early 2021. To help local businesses tender for work on the project, the state government created a Local Capability Fund to award grants to local businesses. In March 2020, two consortia were shortlisted: the Forrest Alliance, comprising CPB Contractors, Carey MC, Densford Civil, GHD and BG&E; and Southwest Connex, comprising Acciona, NRW Contracting, MACA Civil, AECOM and Aurecon. Due to the COVID-19 recession, the tendering process was fast tracked by three months to create jobs as soon as possible. In April 2020, a contract for early works, including earthworks, fencing and planting, was awarded to Fulton Hogan. Southwest Connex was chosen as the preferred proponent in August 2020, and they were awarded the contract in October 2020, now known under the name of South West Gateway Alliance. The project was billed as the South West's largest ever infrastructure project.

The design of the interchange with South Western Highway was modified to allow movements in all possible directions as part of a redesign released in December 2019. This was in response to the City of Bunbury's fears that the BORR's design encouraged people to bypass Bunbury, although concerns remained with the interchange with Forrest Highway.

Construction commenced on 29 January 2021.

The federal government revealed it would spend an additional $320 million on the project in its March 2022 budget due to labour shortages and an increase in the cost of raw materials. The state government revealed it would spend an additional $80 million on the project in its May 2022 budget, bringing the total cost increase to $400 million. This was accompanied by a decrease in the project's scope, with four interchanges being replaced with at-grade intersections at Discovery Road, Lillydale Road, Willinge Drive and the southern section of South Western Highway. In response to suggestions that the project should be abandoned, Transport Minister Rita Saffioti said "we are mid-way through this project so we believe abandoning it would not be the right decision".

Stage three was controversial as it cut into the habitat of the critically endangered western ringtail possum. To offset the loss in habitat, the EPA recommended that Main Roads Western Australia protect and buy  of existing habitat nearby, and create  of habitat in places such as the Ludlow State Forest. Federal environmental approval for stage three was given in June 2022, allowing construction to commence in July 2022. Over 300 people protested when machinery was being moved in, with several people being issued with move-on notices by police for blocking machinery. Former Greens leader Bob Brown spoke at a gathering of protesters, saying "there's alternatives, there's open cleared areas where the proposed road could go but there's no alternative to this woodland for these rare creatures that live in it". On 5 August 2022, clearing for the third stage was paused due to a Federal Court injunction. Three days later, the injunction was extended, and on 9 August, the court dismissed the injunction, allowing clearing to continue.

Junction list

See also
Robertson Drive, also known as the Bunbury Inner Ring Road
Perth Freight Link, a similarly controversial road project that was cancelled in 2017 due to environmental impacts

References

External links
Bunbury Outer Ring Road on the Main Roads Western Australia website

Proposed roads in Australia
Highways in rural Western Australia
Bunbury, Western Australia
Bypasses in Australia